Kunwar Naveed Jamil is a Pakistani politician who is the member of the Provincial Assembly of Sindh since August 2018. Previously, he had been a member of the been a member of the National Assembly of Pakistan, from April 2015 to May 2018.

Education
He holds the degree of Bachelor of Laws and Bachelor of Science.

Political career

He was elected to the Provincial Assembly of Sindh as a candidate of Muttahida Qaumi Movement (MQM) from Constituency PS-106 (Karachi-XVIII) in 2002 Pakistani general election. He received 24,581 votes and defeated Islamuddin Ayubi, a candidate of Muttahida Majlis-e-Amal (MMA). In November 2005, he resigned from the Provincial Assembly of Sindh.

In November 2005, he was elected as the mayor of district Hyderabad.

He was elected to the National Assembly of Pakistan as a candidate of MQM from Constituency NA-246 (Karachi-VIII) in a by-election held in 2015. He received 95,644 votes and defeated Imran Ismail, a candidate of Pakistan Tehreek-e-Insaf (PTI).

He was re-elected to Provincial Assembly of Sindh as a candidate of MQM from Constituency PS-127 (Karachi Central-V) in 2018 Pakistani general election.

References

Living people
Muhajir people
Muttahida Qaumi Movement MPAs (Sindh)
Pakistani MNAs 2013–2018
Politicians from Karachi
Mayors of Hyderabad, Sindh
Politicians from Hyderabad, Sindh
Sindh MPAs 2002–2007
Sindh MPAs 2018–2023
Year of birth missing (living people)